Stonebeck Up is a civil parish in Harrogate district, North Yorkshire, England.  The only village in the parish is Middlesmoor.  The population of the parish in the 2011 census was 119.

The parish occupies the highest part of Nidderdale.  It is bounded on the south side by Stean Beck, from which the parish takes its name (stean being a dialect form of "stone"), and which separates it from the parish of Stonebeck Down.  To the west and north it is bounded by a ridge, including the summits of Great Whernside and Little Whernside, and to the east it is bounded by Masham Moor, a ditch known as Mere Dike, and the River Nidd.  The parish includes Angram and Scar House Reservoirs, and large areas of grouse moor.

Historically Stonebeck Up was a township in the ancient parish of Kirkby Malzeard in the West Riding of Yorkshire.  In the Middle Ages it formed part of the lands of Byland Abbey, which established granges at Middlesmoor, Newhouses, Woodale, Lodge, Angram, Haden Carr and Scar House.  The granges survived as farming communities into the twentieth century.  Angram and Haden Carr were submerged by the reservoirs, and Lodge was abandoned when Scar House Reservoir was constructed in the 1920s.

Stonebeck Up became a separate civil parish in 1866, and was transferred from the West Riding to North Yorkshire in 1974.  The parish now shares the Upper Nidderdale grouped parish council with the parishes of Stonebeck Down and Fountains Earth.

References

External links 

Nidderdale
Civil parishes in North Yorkshire